Sophie Alexandra Tweed-Simmons (born July 7, 1992) is an American-Canadian singer, television personality, and model who promotes body positivity.

Early life 
Simmons was born in Los Angeles, California, the daughter of Shannon Tweed, a Canadian actress and model, and Gene Simmons, an Israeli-American musician and bass player for Kiss. Sophie Simmons is a dual American and Canadian citizen.

At 14 years old, Simmons began appearing on the reality television series Gene Simmons Family Jewels on A&E. The show featuring the family of four, including her brother Nick Simmons, ran for seven seasons from 2006 to 2012.

She attended Pitzer College in Claremont, California, majoring in computer engineering and religious studies. While attending Pitzer, she played volleyball for the Pomona/Pitzer Sagehens. Simmons explained she initially actively avoided her parents' career path: "I avoided the [music and modelling world] for a long time because I didn't want the comparisons between my parents and myself".

Career 
In January 2012, Simmons lent her name to Sophie's Place, a partly government-funded child advocacy centre. She advocated for the creation of the centre with the help of the mayor of Surrey, British Columbia, Dianne Watts, and the Royal Canadian Mounted Police. Simmons and her family continue to support The Centre for Child Development and Sophie's Place Child and Youth Advocacy Centre by fundraising for the organizations which provide "a safe space where [children] can talk about their experience of physical, mental or sexual abuse with trained staff and law enforcement professionals."

In 2014, Simmons launched a body positive clothing line for The Style Club. She became a model, an advocate for body positivity. She was also featured in the 2016 documentary Straight/Curve which focuses on the debate over body image in modelling.

In 2012, Simmons auditioned for the second season of the Fox music competition show The X Factor. She advanced to the Bootcamp but was eliminated in that stage of the competition. In June 2013, she performed along with the Canadian vocal group The Tenors at their performance at the Greek Theatre in Los Angeles, California.

In 2015, Simmons released her debut single, "Kiss Me", a cover of the Sixpence None the Richer's 1998 song by the same name. In March 2017, she collaborated with the DJ duo Yellow Claw for a song on their second studio album, Los Amsterdam. Simmons is the lyricist and vocalist on the album's first track, "Home".

In early 2018, she released two solo singles, "Black Mirror" and "Burn Me Down". The music video for "Black Mirror" was released on February 23 on Billboard. Written by Simmons a year earlier, the song, like the television show from which it gets its name, deals with people's relationship with their smartphones and social media. "Black Mirror" debuted on Billboards Dance Club Songs chart at Number 43 on April 14. The song remained on the list for ten weeks peaking at Number 20.

Simmons again wrote a single with Yellow Claw and DOLF called "Cry Wolf", released in April 2018. The song featuring Simmons on vocals was released as a single before Yellow Claw's third album, New Blood. Simmons was also credited as one of the composers on "Summertime", a song featuring San Holo on New Blood. In June 2018, she released her third solo single of the year, "Paper Cut".

Filmography

Discography

As lead artist

As collaborator

Promotional singles

References

External links 
 
 

Living people
21st-century American women singers
21st-century American singers
21st-century Canadian women singers
1992 births
American people of Hungarian-Jewish descent
American people of Israeli descent
American people of Canadian descent
Canadian people of Hungarian-Jewish descent
Canadian people of Israeli descent
Canadian people of American descent
Jewish American musicians
Jewish Canadian musicians
Jewish singers
Participants in American reality television series
People from Los Angeles
The X Factor (American TV series) contestants
21st-century American Jews